This article contains lists of achievements in major senior-level international Olympic team ball sports tournaments according to first-place, second-place and third-place results obtained by teams representing different nations. The objective is not to create combined medal tables; the focus is listing the best positions achieved by teams in major international tournaments, ranking every nation according to most number of podiums accomplished by each nations team.

Olympic team ball sports
Ten team ball sports which involve five or more players per side are currently on the program of the Olympic Games:

 Summer Olympic sports –
 Winter Olympic sports

*Technically, ice hockey is a puck sport, not a ball sport. It is played with a hockey puck.
†Field handball was introduced for men at the 1936 Summer Olympics, but dropped after that.
‡Baseball and softball were removed from the program for the 2012 and 2016 Summer Olympics, but were added for the 2020 Summer Olympics.

Popularity of Olympic team ball sports

Summer Olympic sports are divided into five categories based on popularity. Category A represents the most popular sports; category E lists either the sports that are the least popular or that are new to the Olympics (golf and rugby). The current categories are:

 Basketball, football, and volleyball, in the Category B, are the most popular Summer Olympic team ball sports.
 Aquatic sports in the Olympics include diving, marathon swimming, swimming, synchronized swimming, and water polo.
 Baseball and softball were removed from the program for the 2012 and 2016 Summer Olympics, so they are not listed above.
 Ice hockey is a Winter Olympic sport, and it is not listed above.

Results
For the making of these lists, results from following major international tournaments were consulted:

 IOC: International Olympic Committee
 FIBA: International Basketball Federation
 FIFA: Fédération Internationale de Football Association
 FIH: International Hockey Federation
 FINA: Fédération internationale de natation
 FIVB: Fédération Internationale de Volleyball
 IHF: International Handball Federation
 IIHF: International Ice Hockey Federation
 WBSC: World Baseball Softball Confederation
 WR: World Rugby

Medals for the demonstration events are NOT counted. Medals earned by athletes from defunct National Olympic Committees (NOCs) or historical teams are NOT merged with the results achieved by their immediate successor states. The International Olympic Committee (IOC) does NOT combine medals of these nations or teams.

The conventions used on these lists are: OG for Olympic Games, WCH for World Championship, WCup for World Cup, M for Men's tournament, W for Women's tournament, and T for Total.

The tables are pre-sorted by total number of first-place results, second-place results and third-place results, then most first-place results, second-place results, respectively. When equal ranks are given, nations are listed in alphabetical order.

Summer and Winter Olympic team ball sports (ten sports)

Men and women

*Defunct National Olympic Committees (NOCs) or historical teams are shown in italic.
†Non International Olympic Committee (IOC) members.

Men

*Defunct National Olympic Committees (NOCs) or historical teams are shown in italic.
†Non International Olympic Committee (IOC) members.

Women

*Defunct National Olympic Committees (NOCs) or historical teams are shown in italic.
†Non International Olympic Committee (IOC) members.

"Category B": Basketball, (association) football and (indoor) volleyball

Men and women

*Defunct National Olympic Committees (NOCs) or historical teams are shown in italic.
†Non International Olympic Committee (IOC) members.

Men

*Defunct National Olympic Committees (NOCs) or historical teams are shown in italic.
†Non International Olympic Committee (IOC) members.

Women

*Defunct National Olympic Committees (NOCs) or historical teams are shown in italic.
†Non International Olympic Committee (IOC) members.

Baseball & Softball

Basketball

*Defunct National Olympic Committees (NOCs) or historical teams are shown in italic.

(Association) football

*Defunct National Olympic Committees (NOCs) or historical teams are shown in italic.
†Non International Olympic Committee (IOC) members.

(Indoor) handball

*Defunct National Olympic Committees (NOCs) or historical teams are shown in italic.

Field hockey

*Defunct National Olympic Committees (NOCs) or historical teams are shown in italic.
†Non International Olympic Committee (IOC) members.

Rugby sevens

*Defunct National Olympic Committees (NOCs) or historical teams are shown in italic.
†Non International Olympic Committee (IOC) members.

(Indoor) volleyball

*Defunct National Olympic Committees (NOCs) or historical teams are shown in italic.

Water polo

*Defunct National Olympic Committees (NOCs) or historical teams are shown in italic.

Ice hockey

*Defunct National Olympic Committees (NOCs) or historical teams are shown in italic.

See also

 List of major achievements in sports by nation
 Major achievements in association football by nation
 Major achievements in baseball and softball by nation
 Major achievements in basketball by nation
 Major achievements in field hockey by nation
 Major achievements in handball by nation
 Major achievements in ice hockey by nation
 Major achievements in rugby by nation
 Major achievements in volleyball by nation
 Major achievements in water polo by nation

Notes

References

General

Official results
 Olympic sports
 Olympic tournament: Results
 Baseball & Softball
 Olympic tournament: Results
 Men's World Baseball Classic: About, Stats
 Women's Softball World Championship: Past editions
 Basketball
 Men's Olympic tournament: Archive
 Women's Olympic tournament: Archive
 World Cup: Archive
 Women's World Cup: Archive
 (Association) football
 Men's Olympic tournament: Archive, Statistics
 Women's Olympic tournament: Archive, Statistics
 World Cup: Archive, Statistics
 Women's World Cup: Archive, Statistics
 (Indoor) handball
 Olympic tournament: History of the Olympic Games, Competitions Archive
 Men's World Championship: Competitions Archive
 Women's World Championship: Competitions Archive
 Field hockey
 Olympic tournament: Event pages
 World Cup: Event pages
 Rugby sevens
 Olympic tournament: Olympics
 World Cup: World Cup
 (Indoor) volleyball
 Olympic tournament and World Championship: FIVB 2017 Media Guide (pages 48–75) – Indoor Volleyball Records
 Water polo
 Olympic tournament and World Championship: Download HistoFINA Water Polo
 Ice hockey
 Olympic tournament and World Championship: Past Tournaments

Specific

External links

 Olympic Games – official website
 International Basketball Federation (FIBA) – official website
 Fédération Internationale de Football Association (FIFA) – official website
 International Hockey Federation (FIH) – official website
 Fédération internationale de natation (FINA) – official website
 Fédération Internationale de Volleyball (FIVB) – official website
 International Handball Federation (IHF) – official website
 International Ice Hockey Federation (IIHF) – official website
 World Baseball Softball Confederation (WBSC) – official website
 World Rugby (WR) – official website

Olympic team ball sports
Team ball sports
Achievements
Achievements
Achievements
Achievements